The Blues Don't Bother Me! is Matt "Guitar" Murphy's second solo album, first released in 1996 with Roesch Records. It includes contributions by his nephew, Floyd Murphy, Jr.
The title recording, The Blues Don't Bother Me, was licensed by Universal Records as the second track on the Blues Brothers 2000 Original Motion Picture Soundtrack which earned the RIAA Certified Gold Award of 500,000 units sold on March 16, 1998.

Track listing

Reception

AllMusic rated the album 3 stars.

Personnel
 Matt "Guitar" Murphycomposer, guitar, primary artist, producer, vocals
 Floyd Murphy, Jr.composer, drums, guitar (rhythm), percussion
 Jim Biggenssaxophone (tenor)
Baron Raymondesaxophone (alto)
 Joe Roeschdrums
 Roger Youngpiano 
 Scott Spraybass
 Eric Udelbass
 Gary "Sonny, Jr." Onofrioharmonica
 Howard Eldridgevocals

Support
 Joe Roeschexecutive producer, liner notes, mixing
 Sable Roeschassociate producer
 Basil Grabovskydigital editing
 Randy Kingmastering
 Bob Kuttruffengineer
 Keith Lo Bueillustrations
 Vic Steffensmixing

References

External links
 
 

1996 albums
Matt "Guitar" Murphy albums